Floy Joy may refer to:

Floy Joy (band), a 1980s Synthpop band 
"Floy Joy" (song), a 1971 song by The Supremes
Floy Joy (album), a 1972 album by The Supremes